Ypthima antennata, the clubbed ringlet, is a butterfly of the family Nymphalidae. It is found in eastern Africa, South Africa, western Kenya, southern Sudan, Nigeria and Ghana.

The wingspan is 30–34 mm for males and 32–38 mm for females. Adults are on wing year round with peaks from September to May in southern Africa.

The larvae probably feed on Poaceae grasses.

Subspecies
The species may be divided into the following subspecies:
 Ypthima antennata antennata
 Ypthima antennata cornesi Kielland, 1982

References

antennata
Butterflies of Africa
Butterflies described in 1955